Tjøtta is a village in Alstahaug Municipality in Nordland county, Norway. It is located on the southern tip of the island of Tjøtta, which is located south of the large island of Alsta.  The village is located on an island, but it does have a mainland road connection via Norwegian County Road 17 and a series of bridges heading north to the town of Sandnessjøen.  The historic Tjøtta Church is located in the village.  

The climate is mild, compared with most of Northern Norway, with a long summer suited for agriculture.

History
Tjøtta is mentioned in the Heimskringla many times; this was the home of Hárek of Tjøtta, one of the leaders of the peasant army which killed Olav Haraldsson at the Battle of Stiklestad. There is archeological evidence of Iron Age agriculture in the area-  Tjøtta gard, the largest medieval farm in North Norway, is also located in Tjøtta.

From 1862 until 1965, the village of Tjøtta was the administrative centre of the old municipality of Tjøtta.

Media gallery

References

External links
Official Website

Former municipalities of Norway
Villages in Nordland